Carlos Moyá was the defending champion and won in the final 6–2, 6–3 against David Ferrer.

Seeds
A champion seed is indicated in bold text while text in italics indicates the round in which that seed was eliminated.

  David Nalbandian (first round)
  Carlos Moyá (champion)
  Marcelo Ríos (first round)
  Ivan Ljubičić (quarterfinals)
  Fernando Vicente (quarterfinals)
  Agustín Calleri (second round)
  Albert Montañés (first round)
  Jan Vacek (first round)

Draw

References
 2002 Croatia Open Draw

Croatia Open
2002 ATP Tour